The 2023 Southern Conference women's Basketball tournament will be held March 2–5, 2023, at the Harrah's Cherokee Center in Asheville, North Carolina. The winner of this tournament earns an automatic bid to the 2023 NCAA Division I women's basketball tournament.

Seeds
Teams are seeded by record within the conference, with a tiebreaker system to seed teams with identical conference records.

Schedule
All tournament games are streamed on ESPN+. The championship will be televised across the region on select Nexstar stations and simulcast on ESPN+.

Bracket
 All times are Eastern.

* denotes overtime period

See also
2023 Southern Conference men's basketball tournament

References

2022–23 Southern Conference women's basketball season
SoCon women's
Southern Conference women's basketball tournament
Southern Conference Women's Basketball Tournament